Methagu 2 is a 2022 Indian Tamil-language political thriller film based on the life of Velupillai Prabhakaran. The film is a sequel to Methagu (2021), and was released on an OTT platform on 19 August 2022.

Cast 
 Gowrishankar as Velupillai Prabhakaran
Karthik as Seelan [Charles Anthony]
Yoagandran as [Ponnamman]
Nassar in a guest appearance

Production 
Prior to the release of the film, Yoagandran received an offer to make his second Tamil film, which would feature Rakshan in the lead role.

Release 
Methagu 2 was released on 19 August 2022 on the OTT platform tamilsott.com. Kalki of Tamil Guardian noted "despite its flaws, Methagu 2 is an important film in archiving the history of man who grew to be the leader of both the Tamil Tigers and of a movement that continues to have significant impact on the Tamil homeland and around the world".

References

External links 
 

2020s biographical films
2020s Tamil-language films
2022 films
2022 thriller films
Biographical films about revolutionaries
Cultural depictions of Sri Lankan people
Indian political thriller films